Si Te Vas ("If You Go") is a song written and performed by Mexican singer-songwriter Pedro Fernández. The song was released in 1995 as the second single from his album Mi Forma De Sentir (1994). The song was recognized by Broadcast Music, Inc. as one of the award winnings at the 1997 BMI Latin Awards.

Grupo Cañaveral with Pedro Fernández duet version

In September 2016 Pedro Fernández collaborated with Grupo Cañaveral for their upcoming 20-year anniversary album. The recording took place at the well-known Ragga Primitive Freedom bar in Plaza Antara, in Polanco, where the group led by Humberto and Emir Pabón, accompanied by Pedro Fernández recorded the song "Si Te Vas", authored by the Pedro and now with a Cumbia twist. Full story and performance link in referenced article. 

The album was released 27 January 2017 and is titled "Fiesta Total" by Grupo Cañaveral De Humberto Pabon and features the latest version of "Si Te Vas" by Pedro Fernández

Weekly charts

Marc Anthony version

In 1997, American singer Marc Anthony covered "Si Te Vas" on his third studio album Contra la Corriente. The song became his ninth number-one song on the Latin Tropical Airplay chart. Fernández received another BMI Latin Award in 1999 for Anthony's version of the song.

Charts

Weekly charts

Year-end charts

See also
List of Billboard Tropical Airplay number ones of 1998

References

1994 songs
1995 singles
1998 singles
Pedro Fernández (singer) songs
Marc Anthony songs
Songs written by Pedro Fernández (singer)
RMM Records singles